A color solid is the three-dimensional representation of a color model, an analog of the two-dimensional color wheel.  The added spatial dimension allows a color solid to depict an added dimension of color variation.  Whereas a two-dimensional color wheel typically depicts the variables of hue (red, green, blue, etc.) and lightness (gradations of light and dark, tints or shades), a color solid adds the variable of colorfulness (either chroma or saturation), allowing the solid to depict all conceivable colors in an organized three-dimensional structure.

Organization

Different color theorists have each designed unique color solids.  Many are in the shape of a sphere, whereas others are warped three-dimensional ellipsoid figures—these variations being designed to express some aspect of the relationship of the colors more clearly.  The color spheres conceived by Phillip Otto Runge and Johannes Itten are typical examples and prototypes for many other color solid schematics.

Pure, saturated hues of equal brightness are located around the equator at the periphery of the color sphere.  As in the color wheel, contrasting (or complementary) hues are located opposite each other.  Moving toward the center of the color sphere on the equatorial plane, colors become less and less saturated, until all colors meet at the central axis as a neutral gray.  Moving vertically in the color sphere, colors become lighter (toward the top) and darker (toward the bottom). At the upper pole, all hues meet in white; at the bottom pole, all hues meet in black.  

The vertical axis of the color sphere, then, is gray all along its length, varying from black at the bottom to white at the top.  All pure (saturated) hues are located on the surface of the sphere, varying from light to dark down the color sphere.  All impure (unsaturated hues, created by mixing contrasting colors) comprise the sphere's interior, likewise varying in brightness from top to bottom.

Usage 

Artists and art critics find the color solid to be a useful means of organizing the three variables of color—hue, lightness, and saturation (or chroma), as modelled in the HCL and HSL color models—in a single schematic, using it as an aid in the composition and analysis of visual art.

See also 

 Color model
 Color triangle
 Color wheel

References

External links
 Runge's Color Sphere (Java applet does not work in all Web browsers)

Color
Color space